Government Expenditure and Revenue Scotland (GERS) is an annual estimate of the level of public revenue raised in Scotland and the level of public spending for the residents of Scotland under current constitutional arrangements. It was first published in 1992, and yearly since 1995, with the exceptions of 2007 where there was no report due to a methodology review, and 2016 where there were two annual reports due to an acceleration of publishing timescale.

Since devolution, it has been compiled by economists and statisticians in the Office of the Chief Economic Adviser of the Scottish Government. The report is based partly on actual spend and income. Where actual data is not readily available, estimates for Scotland are made by the compilers e.g. Whitehall reserves 74% of Scotland's revenue and 37% of its spending; the data for the estimates are from a variety of sources including pan UK data provided by the UK Government's Office for National Statistics (ONS). ONS in England and Wales co-ordinates data collection with the respective bodies in Northern Ireland and Scotland, namely NISRA and National Records of Scotland. GERS is designated as a National Statistics product, which means that it is produced independently of Scottish Ministers and has been assessed by the UK Statistics Authority as being produced in line with the Code of Practice for Statistics

Background

GERS was first published in 1992 by the Scottish Office in Edinburgh under the Conservative Party government of Prime Minister John Major, by Ian Lang the Secretary of State for Scotland at a time when the government was resisting calls for Scottish devolution. Its overall purpose was to estimate the overall UK borrowing requirement for Scotland - it was created at this time because Scottish Office ministers thought due to then-low oil prices, the report would show Scotland gained far more from the UK Treasury than it received. In a leaked memo the then Secretary of State for Scotland Ian Lang wrote "I judge that [GERS] is just what is needed at present in our campaign to maintain the initiative and undermine the other parties. This initiative could score against all of them.”

The methodology of this first report was questioned - economics professor Hervey Gibson recalled "My reaction, both emotional and professional, was that where Scotland was making disproportionate drawings on the National (UK) exchequer these had usually been carefully estimated and emphasised, and where it was making net or disproportionate contributions to the exchequer these had been assumed away or hidden under crude assumptions about ‘reflecting national averages’".

The second report was published in November 1995, covering financial year 1993-1994. Reports for each financial year since this year have been published.

In 1998, the University of Strathclyde published the Jim and Margaret Cuthbert-authored "A critique of GERS: government expenditure and revenue in Scotland." This criticised primarily the adequacy of the methodology used and the accuracy of data sources as well as the purpose of a GERS exercise.

In 1999, GERS (for financial year 1997/1998) was published by the newly formed Scottish Executive for the first time.

In 2008 GERS for 2006/7 was published, including data for 2005/2006 (there was no report in 2007). This was the first fundamental review of GERS since it achieved National Statistics status in 2005, the changes were also instigated under the new SNP government who wished to address the criticisms noted above and were supported by the Cuthberts in their changes. A number of presentation, data source and methodology changes were made. None of the changes radically altered the results of the analysis of Scotland's fiscal balance. The Cuthberts welcomed the "significant" methodological improvements, though noting scope for further improvements in overall Scottish financial reporting (not related to GERS itself).

The report

Objective

The authors of GERS's stated primary objective is to estimate a set of public sector accounts for Scotland through detailed analysis of official UK and Scottish Government finance statistics. The authors estimate the contribution of revenue raised in Scotland toward the goods and services provided for the benefit of the people of Scotland."

Data sources

The 2015-16 GERS report states:

 The source of the revenue data in GERS is the ONS's Public Sector Finances, which provides disaggregated figures relating to UK public sector revenue.
 The primary data sources used to estimate Scottish public sector expenditure in GERS are HM Treasury's Public Expenditure Statistical Analyses and the supporting Country and Regional Analysis (CRA).
 GERS also makes use of the estimates of Scottish Gross Domestic Product (GDP) in current market prices published in the Quarterly National Accounts Scotland (QNAS).
 All estimates for Scotland made within GERS are conducted by the Scottish Government, the UK government do not estimate for Scotland nor are they involved in agreeing the data to be used by the Scottish Government.

Compilation

GERS is compiled by statisticians and economists in the Office of the Chief Economic Adviser of the Scottish Government, with the Scottish Government's chief statistician taking overall responsibility for the publication.

Political use and criticism

GERS has frequently formed part of the debate on Scottish Independence.

GERS and the 2014 Scottish independence referendum

In November 2013, GERS figures from the most recent available report (financial year 2011/2012) were included within Scotland's Future, the Scottish Government's independence white paper. Based on the GERS report it was stated that, compared to the UK, Scotland: contributed more tax per head; had stronger public finances; and had much higher GDP per head

Based on the methodologies used, falling oil revenues resulted in the final GERS report before the referendum, published in March 2014, indicating a weaker Scottish economic position than previous years. The nominal Scottish deficit went from 5% in financial year 2011/2012 to 8.3% in 2012/2013.

However, methodology was still an issue - in May 2014 Merryn Somerset Webb in the Financial Times sought input to GERS credibility from James Ferguson of The MacroStrategy Partnership. Ferguson referred to the notes to the GERS numbers which say that, save for a few local revenues, "separate identification of most other revenues for Scotland is not possible. GERS, therefore, uses a number of different methodologies to apportion tax revenues to Scotland. In doing so, there are often theoretical and practical challenges in determining an appropriate share to allocate to Scotland. In certain cases, a variety of alternative methodologies could be applied each leading to different estimates." It is, said Ferguson, a "pretty blatant case of starting with the answer and working out the more granular line-by-line 'estimates' backwards." Webb added, "No economic figures are entirely accurate but this is different: the basic revenue numbers are more or less guesswork, to which is added an so far entirely un-negotiated share of UK oil revenues. So there you go. I’m giving you one less thing to think about: you can now happily ignore all the financial arguments for a separate Scotland on the basis that no one knows what they actually are." In March 2017 Somerset Webb stated on Twitter that the article "was wrong" but didn't elaborate on how.

Criticisms of GERS

Graeme Roy of the Fraser of Allander Institute acknowledged shortcomings of GERS but said regarding the use of estimation "But even significant differences in estimation – and well outside that which could be considered statistically reasonable – don’t change the overall headline figures". He concluded that of the topics worth debating "questioning the integrity and robustness of National Statistics is not one of them".

Deloitte said of GERS figures in 2017 referring to the impact on Scotland of a recent global slump in oil prices, "Commentators suggested that, under these conditions, Scotland would struggle to operate as an independent country. However, GERS data is produced for Scotland as part of the UK - it does not model scenarios for an independent Scotland in which the Scottish government would be enabled to make its own fiscal choices".

Richard Murphy criticised the reliability of the data sources used for GERS. He also remarked they were liable to manipulation by the London-based UK Government. Murphy also supported the Deloitte view by stating, "nothing will be the same if Scotland leaves: a government of an independent Scotland will have a very different structure to that imposed now." It should be noted however that at a subsequent appearance before the Holyrood, Finance and Constitution Committee, Murphy was criticised for being unable to justify these claims.

See also
 Barnett formula
 Cabinet Secretary for Finance, Employment and Sustainable Growth
 Commission on Scottish Devolution
 Fiscal autonomy for Scotland
 Local income tax (Scotland)
 McCrone report
 Public Accounts Committee of the Scottish Parliament
 Public Contracts Scotland
 Scottish budget
 Scottish Consolidated Fund
 Scottish Variable Rate
 Scotland Bill 2011
 Taxation in Scotland
 Union dividend

References

External links
 Official website at the Scottish Government

Fiscal federalism
Reports of the Scottish Government
Public finance of Scotland